The history of the Jews in Botswana is relatively modern and centered in the city of Gaborone. Most Jews in Botswana are Israelis and South Africans.

History
Only about 100 Jews lived in Botswana during the 2000s, with almost all living in Gaborone. The community was predominantly Jewish Israelis working in agriculture, business, and industry. No synagogues exist in Botswana. The South African Jewish Board of Deputies provides rabbis for the community during the High Holidays. Services are typically held at Jewish homes or at communal centers. Jews in Botswana are buried in non-Jewish cemeteries, as there is no Jewish cemetery in the country. Kosher food is imported from South Africa.

Botswana renewed diplomatic recognition of Israel in 1993. The Israeli representative in Botswana is the Israeli ambassador to Zimbabwe.

In May of 2021, during the COVID-19 pandemic in Botswana, the Baruch Padeh Medical Center sent a delegation of Israeli doctors to assist Botswana during the pandemic. The Israeli delegation partnered with the Sir Ketumile Masire Teaching Hospital in Gaborone.

According to the World Jewish Congress, only 21 Jews live in Botswana. The Jewish community of Botswana is one of the youngest Jewish communities in Africa. The community is represented by the Jewish Community of Botswana, the Botswanan affiliate of the World Jewish Congress.

Notable Botswanan Jews
Benjamin Steinberg, a Botswanan cattle rancher and politician who was the first Treasurer of the Botswana Democratic Party and the first white Botswanan Member of Parliament in 1965.

See also
Angolan Jews
Namibian Jews
South African Jews
Zambian Jews
Zimbabwean Jews

References

External links
Botswana, Jews Were Here

Israeli diaspora
Jews and Judaism in Southern Africa
Religion in Botswana
South African-Jewish diaspora